Amour de poche (Girl in His Pocket) is a French comedy fantasy film from 1957, directed by Pierre Kast, written by France Roche, starring Jean Marais. The scenario was based on a novel Diminishing Draft of Waldemar Kaempffert.

Cast 
 Jean Marais : Jérôme Nordman
 Geneviève Page : Édith Guérin
 Jean-Claude Brialy : Jean-Loup
 Agnès Laurent : Monette Landry
 Alexandre Astruc : 1er employé des objets trouvés
 Christian-Jaque : 2e employé
 Léo Joannon : 3e employé
 Jean-Pierre Melville : commissar
 Hubert Deschamps : inspector
 Boris Vian : manager of baths
 Alex Joffé : seller of articles of camping
 France Roche : Anne-Lise
 Michel André : secretary in the police office
 Yves Barsacq : student
 Alfred Pasquali : Bataillon
 Jacques Hilling : professor
 Amédée: Maubru
 Régine Lovi : Brigitte
 Joëlle Janin : Solange
 Victor Vicas : the secretary of town hall

See also
List of films featuring miniature people

References

External links 
 
 Un amour de poche (1957) at the Films de France

1957 films
1950s romantic fantasy films
1950s fantasy comedy films
1950s French-language films
French black-and-white films
Films directed by Pierre Kast
Films about size change
Films scored by Georges Delerue
French fantasy comedy films
1957 comedy films
1950s French films